Rajadhi Raja is a 2009 Tamil language masala film written and directed by Sakthi Chidambaram and produced by Radha Sakthi Chidambaram. It stars Lawrence Raghavendra, Mumtaj, Snigdha Akolkar, Kamna Jethmalani, Meenakshi, and Karunas. The film was released on 15 May 2009 and received a huge negative response.

Plot
Raja (Raghava Lawrence) is a native of Coutrallam. Tragedy strikes his adolescent life when his father loses his hand when a doctor in an inebriated condition operates on him. The doctor fearing legal consequences bribes the local police to take care of the issue. Young Raja witnesses police brutality on his father causing his father's death. On his deathbed, his father gets a promise from Raja that he would make his three brothers into a cop, lawyer, and doctor. Raja realises his mission, and stops his studies to earn money to make his brothers into what he promised.

The brothers are provided shelter and food by a local elderly woman (Paravai Muniyamma) whom Raja affectionately calls as paati. She has a granddaughter Lakshmi (Neelima Rani), whom Raja considers as his own sister.

Now Raja in his adulthood makes ends meet as a bus driver, while his three brothers become doctor, policeman and lawyer as per his father's wish.

One day, his sister complains about eve-teasing. Raja dismisses the claim and asks her to attend. She convinces him to come with her. On seeing her a group of college men remark that Raja's sister indeed has a curvy Hourglass figure and proceeds to molest her. Enraged by this Raja fights and chases them away warning others to stay away from his sister.

Raja is often kidnapped by Thangapazham (Meenakshi) who expresses her love for Raja and tries to woo him repeatedly. Raja escapes from her while she's distracted. However Raja's friend Krishnamoorthy (Karunas) in turn expresses his love to Thangapazham which she blatantly ignores.

Meanwhile Shailja (Mumtaj), a woman gangster turned politician is seen beating up a cop for not falling on her feet. Eventually she murders him and mocks at his dead body for falling on her feet after death.

During a college function Lakshmi and Shailaja get into an altercation. Shailaja takes Lakshmi and humiliates her. Raja comes to his sister's rescue by beating up the goons and humiliates her by forcing her own goons to pose few pictures with her in inappropriate positions just like she did to his sister.

Raja then gets into a local Jallikattu competition which he eventually wins. The organizer, a local village chief announces that Raja will wed his daughter. He pulls his friend Krishna Murthy along in this mess. At the wedding Raja is desperate to escape but unable to do so. Thangapazham enters and stops the wedding by throwing a hand grenade in the crowd causing people to run.

After this, Lakshmi gets sick and is admitted into the hospital run by Raja's brother. However in the absence of Raja the greedy brother demands money and gets into a fight with Paati. When she slaps him before his staff and patients, he brutally murders the sister out of rage and sends goons to eliminate the old woman the only eyewitness. But she reveals to Raja the fact that his brothers are all  criminals and then dies. It is revealed that all three brothers are corrupt accomplices of Shailaja.

After learning this, Raja swears an oath to teach his three brothers a good lesson by betraying them while acting to be on their side.

When spying on his brothers he meets with Nikhita (Snigdha Akolkar), a girl who admires Raja for his character. It is revealed that she is the sister of the dreaded Shailaja.

The lawyer brother, with the help of the principal of a local school, sedates and tries to abuse a student. Raja wearing a helmet enters and beats the brother vigorously, saving the girl. His brother can't see the face of the assaulter.

Enters Nurse Namitha (Kamna Jethmalani),a modern woman ogled by many men in the hospital. Raja eventually ends up befriending her, when he tries to perform a stint against his brother to collect evidences.

Raja then witnesses his police brother brutally stir up a riot and intentionally kill an innocent civilian using a sledgehammer brutally smashing the skull. At night, when the police officer pairs up with a high-class prostitute Babilona in his police vehicle, Raja ties the vehicle and traps them inside using a crane. He gets caught red-handed the next morning and is suspended from office.
The three brothers initially suspect Raja, but he manipulates them into believing that he's innocent.

The doctor brother is also a pervert who keeps camera inside the nurses'dressing room to watch them in his laptop. When the doctor leaves the room for operation, Raja breaks the camera and also steals the doctor's laptop for evidence. Finally beats the doctor viciously.

Later knowing about her sister's love for Raja, Shailaja orders her goons to beat up Raja. He beats them. He then asks Nikita to slap her sister Shailaja with her sandal, in order to confirm her love for  him, which she happily does.

During an award ceremony, Raja blackmails with the previous evidences he gathered, forcing his doctor brother to announce in front of the crowd that he will perform 100 free heart surgeries.

Shailaja later enters the brothers home for a meet. Fearing recognition Raja masks his face with shaving cream and mimicks a subtle voice. Failing to recognise him, she has a quick convo with Raja and leaves.

During a visit to a temple function, Shailaja's caravan is abducted and taken control by Raja and Krishna Murthy. He then forces Shailaja to wear slinky clothes by blackmailing her using an evidence of her murdering a temple official. She agrees out of fear. On seeing her in such skimpy clothes on a temple occasion, people get angry and start riots thus making her eventually lose her minister position.

Angered she returns to her old gangster form and plots to kill Raja once and for all. She learns that he is the brother of her accomplices through a news clip. The brothers fake their death to lure Raja, who is then left to dead after injured severely by his brothers and Shailaja. However he is then saved by Krishna Murthy and Nikita. He stops the bad guys and beats everyone of them to death. Finally it is shown that after jail Raja married Nikitha with the help of Thangapazham.

Cast

Raghava Lawrence as Raja
Mumtaj as Shailaja
Snigdha Akolkar as Nikhita
Kamna Jethmalani as Namitha
Meenakshi as Thangapazham
Karunas as Krishnamoorthy
Premsai as Dr. Paul
Bose Venkat as Assistant Commissioner Pandian
Yugendran as Advocate
Neelima Rani as Lakshmi, Raja's sister
Paravai Muniyamma as Raja's grandmother
Chaams as Doctor
Santhana Bharathi
Singamuthu
Mayilsamy
Chetan
Bonda Mani
Kiran Rathod in an item number

Production
After Sandai, Sakthi Chidambaram announced his next project called Rajathi Raja, the title derived from Rajinikanth's 1989 film of the same name. Sakthi has acquired the rights of title from Pavalar creations, production company of music composer Ilayaraja which produced the original film. The film was launched in July 2008 at AVM Studios.

Snigdha Akolkar was chosen for a role after Kajal Aggarwal, Pooja, Sandhya, Namitha, and Lakshmi Rai all pulled out of the film. Actress Sameksha's role was removed as the length of the film was getting too long. Meenakshi of Karuppusamy Kuththagaithaarar and Kamna Jethmalani of Idhaya Thirudan were selected as the other heroines, while Mumtaj was selected to play a negative role and also dubbed her voice for the first time, thus making her comeback.

Soundtrack
Initially, Dhina was selected as the composer, but he was removed and was replaced by comedian Karunas, who made his debut as music director in this film. Paul Jacob, a Sri Lankan composer who composed for films like Thalaimagan and Kizhakku Kadalkarai Salai, was another composer. The lyrics for all songs were written by director Perarasu. The audio was released on 11 May 2009.
 "Kandha Kadambha Kathiresa" - Sam P. Keerthan
 "Elanthapazham (Remix)" - Shakthisree Gopalan, Dinesh
 "Yaaro Oruthi" - Madhu Balakrishnan, Deepa
 "Kathirikaa" - Karunas, Grace
 "Aandipatti Arasampatti" - T. Rajender, Pop Shalini

Critical reception
Nowrunning wrote: "Rajaathi Raja is such a bad film that the sequence of events in the movie would fail to convince even a three-year-old child". Behindwoods wrote:"Overall, Rajadhi Raja is a tale of gross underestimation of audiences’ tastes. There is a very fine line between being commercial and being crass. Unfortunately, Shakthi Chidambaram finds himself on the wrong side of the line this time". Rediff wrote:"For sheer, mind-numbing crudity, there's no equal to Rajadhi Raja". Sify wrote:"Sakthi Chidambaram’s Rajadhi Raja is the crudest masala movie seen in recent times".

Controversies
After the release, Chidambaram lashed out at actress Suhasini for giving negative reviews against his film.

References

External links
Rajadhi Raja profile at Poochandi

2009 films
Indian action comedy films
2000s masala films
2000s Tamil-language films
2009 action comedy films
2009 comedy films
Films directed by Sakthi Chidambaram